20 Años de Éxitos En Vivo con Moderatto (20 Years of Hits Live with Moderatto) is the third live album by Mexican recording artist Alejandra Guzmán. It was released by EMI Latin on June 21, 2011 and features the participation of Moderatto as her backing band. Jay de la Cueva worked as producer of the album, which was recorded at the Palacio de los Deportes in Mexico City on March 17, 2011. The album includes Guzmán's greatest hits, a song originally performed by Moderatto, and two newly recorded songs, including the theme song of the Mexican telenovela Una Familia con Suerte.

The album entered the top five in Mexico and the top twenty in the United States. To promote the album, a video for the song "Un Grito en la Noche", previously a single from Guzmán's album Eternamente Bella (1990), was released in September 2011. The standard edition of the album in Mexico includes a DVD documentary about the recording sessions. 20 Años de Éxitos En Vivo con Moderatto received a platinum+gold certification in Mexico by the Asociación Mexicana de Productores de Fonogramas y Videogramas and garnered four nominations for the Premios Oye!, including Album of the Year.

Background
To commemorate 20 years of musical career, Alejandra Guzmán decided to record a live album at the Palacio de los Deportes in Mexico City. Guzmán asked Jay de la Cueva to produce the album and include his band Moderatto in the show. About the recording, Guzmán said that the main reason is to have a more produced show to perform songs of the bad and good things that have happened to her, "it's been many years, we want to make them [the public] happy." The album was recorded after Guzmán's featured performance on the album En Primera Fila by Venezuelan singer-songwriter Franco De Vita, with the song "Tan Sólo Tú", which resulted in two nominations for the Latin Grammy Awards of 2011: Record of the Year and Best Long Form Music Video. The album is Guzmán's third live album following La Guzmán (1998) and Alejandra Guzmán En Vivo (2003).

Repertoire
Ten songs previously recorded by the singer are included: "Llama Por Favor", "Un Grito en la Noche" and the title track from her album Eternamente Bella of 1990. "Hacer El Amor Con Otro" and "Güera" are taken from Flor de Papel (1991). "Mala Hierba" and "Mírala, Míralo" were first included on Libre in 1993. "De Verdad" was the lead single from Soy (2001). "Volverte a Amar" from Indeleble in 2006. "Verano Peligroso" is the theme song of a film starred by Guzmán in 1991, and was first included on her compilation album Lo Más Prendido. The album is the first to feature the song "Día de Suerte", the theme song of the Mexican telenovela Una Familia con Suerte. "Ya Lo Veía Venir" was the first single from Moderatto's 2008 album Queremos Rock. "No Te Lo Tomes Personal" is a new song written by Jay de la Cueva and Guzmán.

Recording and release
20 Años de Éxitos En Vivo con Moderatto was recorded on March 17, 2011 at Palacio de los Deportes in Mexico City. Guzmán was joined on stage by the Mexican band Moderatto, where they performed before a selected audience of fans. American singer Jenni Rivera accompanied the singer on the song "Eternamente Bella", while Puerto-Rican performer Vico C joined them on "Mala Hierba". Guzmán also presented the song "Día de Suerte" for the first time. Guzmán declared on her experience working with Moderatto: "On stage, when I'm with them, everything is magic. Right now I feel part of the band because it made me feel very happy and made me feel like their songs are mine." A long form music video was recorded and included on the standard Mexican edition of the album as an accompanying DVD. This music video opened in several movie theaters in the United States and Mexico, and tickets were available for free to her fans on her official website.

Track listing

Singles

Accolades
Guzmán received four nominations for the Premios Oye! for her work on the album, including Album of the Year and Female Pop Album, winning the latter. 20 Años de Éxitos also earned a nomination for Rock Album of the Year at the Premio Lo Nuestro 2012.

Charts and certifications
The album debuted at number 15 and peaked at number two on the Mexican Albums Chart, being blocked for the number-one by MTV Unplugged by Mexican band Los Tigres del Norte. The album is the highest placement in the chart for Guzmán since Indeleble which peaked at the top in 2006. 20 Años de Éxitos En Vivo con Moderatto earned a platinum certificacion in Mexico by the Asociación Mexicana de Productores de Fonogramas y Videogramas. In the United States, the album debuted and peaked at number 20 in the Billboard Latin Albums and at number seven on the Latin Pop Albums chart, becoming Guzmán's fourth top ten album in the latter chart, following Flor de Papel (1992), Soy (2001) and Reina de Corazones: La Historia (2007).

Weekly charts

Year-end charts

Album certifications

Personnel
 Alejandra Guzmán – vocals
 Bryan Amadeus – vocals, piano, guitars
 Xavi Moderatto – bass guitar
 Mick Marcy – guitar, vocals
 Roy – guitar, vocals
 Elohim Corona – drums
 Jose Portilla – guitar
 Gustavo Borner – recording engineer and mixing
 Juan Luis Falluca – recording engineer
 Toni Francois – photography
 Karola, Micro and Guille – graphic design

Source:

References

2011 live albums
Alejandra Guzmán live albums
EMI Latin live albums
Moderatto live albums
Spanish-language live albums
Albums produced by Jay de la Cueva
2011 video albums
Alejandra Guzmán video albums
Moderatto video albums
Live video albums
EMI Latin video albums
Spanish-language video albums
Live Latin pop albums
Latin pop video albums
Live Rock en Español albums
Rock en Español video albums
Collaborative albums
Albums recorded at the Palacio de los Deportes